Her Body in Bond is a 1918 American silent drama film directed by Robert Z. Leonard and starring Mae Murray, Kenneth Harlan and Alan Roscoe.

Plot

Peggy and Joe Blondin are husband and wife who show their dancing number in New York cabarets. Sick of tuberculosis, however, Joe is forced to leave for the West for treatment, leaving his wife alone. Now she must also work to pay for her husband's care, with his demands for money ever increasing, so much so that the situation leads to despair. In reality, Joe's correspondence is intercepted by Harlan Quinn, a millionaire who has sights on Peggy: the man rewrites the letters by falsifying their contents. After one particularly alarming letter, Peggy accepts an appointment with Harlan who promises his financial help in return. But before the man manages to win the favors of the dancer, Joe arrives in New York, fully healed. The two men have a fight in which Peggy's stepfather, a drug addict who has been tricked by Harlan, intervenes and shoots the millionaire. The police shoot in turn, killing the old man.

Cast
 Mae Murray as Peggy Blondin / Pierrette
 Kenneth Harlan as Joe Blondin / Pierrot
 Alan Roscoe as Harlan Quinn / Harlequin 
 Joseph W. Girard as Benjamin Sleeth 
 Paul Weigel as Emmett Gibson
 Maie B. Havey as Betty Coates

Production
The film was produced by the Universal Film Manufacturing Company under the title 'The Eternal Columbine'. The title was changed to 'The Morals of an Actress' prior to release.

References

Bibliography
 Cooper C. Graham & Christoph Irmscher. Love and Loss in Hollywood: Florence Deshon, Max Eastman, and Charlie Chaplin. Indiana University Press, 2021.

External links
 

1918 films
1918 drama films
1910s English-language films
American silent feature films
Silent American drama films
American black-and-white films
Films directed by Robert Z. Leonard
Universal Pictures films
1910s American films